Jenny Evans (1954) is a British-born naturalized German jazz singer. She was also known as owner of Jenny's Place, a jazz club in Munich's Schwabing district.

Discography
Nuages

References

External links 

 Official website

1954 births
Living people